Dominic Anthony John Rigby (born 17 November 1970) is a Scottish former cricketer and administrator.

Rigby was born at Ayr in November 1970. He initially played club cricket in Scotland for Prestwick Cricket Club, he was a member of Scotland's fifteen man squad which toured Zimbabwe in 1994, where he played minor matches against Zimbabwean provincial sides. Rigby later played two List A one-day matches for Scotland against the Lancashire Cricket Board at Aberdeen in the 2nd round of the 2003 Cheltenham & Gloucester Trophy (played in 2002) and Somerset at Edinburgh in the 3rd round of the same competition (played in 2003). He scored 19 runs in these matches, with a highest score of 15 not out against the Lancashire Cricket Board. Rigby later played club cricket in Ireland for Clontarf Cricket Club until 2013.

References

External links
 

1970 births
Living people
Sportspeople from Ayr
Scottish cricketers